Colin Sinclair (born December 19, 1994) is a Northern Mariana Islander tennis player.

He achieved a career best singles ranking of world No. 410 on 5 August 2019, and a career high doubles ranking of world No. 251 on 20 February 2023. He has won 2 singles titles on the ITF Futures Tour. Additionally, he has won 6 doubles titles on the ITF Futures Tour.

He represents his country in Davis Cup as part of the Pacific Oceania team since 2017 and has a career record of 18–5 (13–3 in singles, 5–2 in doubles) in the competition. He has been coached by Jeff Race, Ian Malpass, and Silviu Tanasoiu.

ATP Challenger and ITF Futures/World Tennis Tour finals

Singles: 10 (2–8)

Doubles: 14 (7–7)

References

External links
 
 
 

Living people
1994 births
Northern Mariana Islands male tennis players
Australian male tennis players
American male tennis players
Cornell Big Red men's tennis players
People from Saipan
Tennis players from Brisbane